Darien may refer to:

Places

Central America
 Darién Gap, break in the Pan-American Highway between Colombia and Panama
 Darién National Park
 Darién Province
 Gulf of Darién

 "... a peak in Darien", phrase in Keats's poem "On First Looking into Chapman's Homer"

United States
Darien, Connecticut
Darien (Metro-North station)
Darien, Georgia
Darien, Illinois
Darien, Missouri
Darien, New York
Darien, Wisconsin
Darien (town), Wisconsin

People

First name
Darien Angadi (1949–1984), British actor
Darien Boswell (1938–2018), New Zealand rower
Darien Brockington (born 1979), American singer
Darien Butler (born 2000), American football player
Darien Fenton (born 1954), New Zealand politician
Darien Ferrer (born 1983), Cuban volleyball player
Darien Graham-Smith (born 1975), British journalist
Darien Sills-Evans (born 1974), American actor

Surname
Georges Darien (1862–1921), French writer

Ships
 , a turbo-electric refrigerated cargo ship
 , World War II refugee ship

Fictional characters
 Camila Darién, in Mexican telenovela Pasión
 Darien Fawkes, in The Invisible Man television series, 2000–2002
 Darien Lambert, a character in the 1990s television series Time Trax
 Darien Maugrim, a character in The Fionavar Tapestry novels by Guy Gavriel Kay
 Darien Shields ( Tuxedo Mask), a protagonist in the anime Sailor Moon

Other uses
Darién, brand of bananas distributed in the U.S. by Turbana (company)
Darien pocket gopher, rodent native to Panama
Darien scheme, 17th century attempt to create a Scottish colony called "Caledonia"
Darien Spirit, a progressive rock band signed to Charisma Records
An alternative name for the extinct Cueva language spoken by the Cueva people

See also
Darian (disambiguation)
Darion (disambiguation)
Dairen, the Japanese name for Dalian, China